The Very Best Of (released as The Complete Greatest Hits in the UK, Australia, and New Zealand) is a two-disc compilation album by the Eagles, released in 2003.  This album combines all tracks that appeared on the two previously released Eagles greatest hits albums (Their Greatest Hits (1971–1975) and Eagles Greatest Hits, Vol. 2), along with other singles not included on the first two compilations, album tracks, and the new track "Hole in the World".

The accompanying booklet to The Very Best Of features commentaries on all of the songs from Glenn Frey and Don Henley, as compiled by Cameron Crowe.

The Very Best Of was also released as a limited-edition three-disc set with the third disc being a bonus DVD containing the video for the new song "Hole in the World", as well as a making of the video featurette and "Backstage Pass to Farewell 1."

Artwork
The artwork for the cover, a horse skull with feathers, is by Boyd Elder. Elder also produced the skull artwork for the Eagles' 1975 album One of These Nights and their compilation album Their Greatest Hits (1971–1975).

Commercial performance
The album debuted on the Billboard 200 on November 8, 2003 at number 3, with 162,000 copies sold. It spent 62 weeks on the chart. The album was certified and awarded gold, platinum, and double platinum records by the RIAA on December 17, 2003, and on December 13, 2004, it achieved triple platinum status.  The album has sold over 5 million units in the United States.

As of December 2007, it has spent over 325 weeks in the Irish Album Charts, effectively not having left the chart since its release. In the UK the album (as The Complete Greatest Hits) entered the charts on November 1, 2003 at its initial number 27 peak position, the album did however re-enter the charts in June 2006 when it peaked at number 9 on the UK Albums Chart.

Track listing 

Tracks 1–3 from Eagles (1972)
Tracks 4–6 from Desperado (1973)
Tracks 7–12 from On the Border (1974)
Tracks 13–16 from One of These Nights (1975)
Track 17 from Hotel California (1976)

Tracks 1–5 from Hotel California (1976)
Track 6 was a non-album single (1978)
Tracks 7–12 from The Long Run (1979)
Track 13 from Eagles Live (1980)
Tracks 14 and 15 from Hell Freezes Over (1994)
Track 16 is a new track (2003)

Personnel 
Glenn Frey – guitars, piano, keyboards, percussion, vocals
Don Henley – drums, percussion, guitars, vocals
Randy Meisner – bass guitar, guitars, guitarrone, vocals (disc one and songs 1–5 on disc two)
Bernie Leadon – guitars, banjo, mandolin, pedal steel guitar, vocals (songs 1–16 on disc one)
Don Felder – guitars, keyboards, synthesizers, vocals (songs 7, 13–17 on disc one and songs 1–15 on disc two)
Joe Walsh – guitars, keyboards, organ, synthesizer, vocals (song 17 on disc one and all of disc two)
Timothy B. Schmit – bass guitar, vocals (songs 6–16 on disc two), lead vocals (songs 9 and 14 on disc two)

Additional personnel
Steuart Smith – guitars (song 16 on disc two)
Scott Crago – drums, percussion (songs 14–16 on disc two)
Will Hollis – piano (songs 14–16 on disc two)
Jim Ed Norman – piano, string arrangements (songs 4, 13, 15 on disc one and songs 2, 4 on disc two)
David Sanborn – alto saxophone (song 8 on disc two)
Al Perkins – pedal steel guitar (song 10 on disc one)

Production 
Producers: Glyn Johns, Bill Szymczyk, Eagles, Elliot Scheiner and Rob Jacobs
Engineers: Allan Blazek, Michael Braunstein, Glyn Johns, Ed Mashal, Bill Szymczyk, Michael Verdick, Ken Villeneuve, and Don Wood

Assistant engineers: Allan Blazek, Howard Kilgour, Tom Trafalski,
Remastering: Ted Jensen
String arrangements: Jim Ed Norman

Charts

Weekly charts

Year-end charts

Certifications

See also 
 List of best-selling albums in Australia

References 

Eagles (band) compilation albums
2003 greatest hits albums
Albums produced by Glyn Johns
Albums produced by Bill Szymczyk
Warner Music Group compilation albums